Samiksha Jaiswal is an Indian actress who primarily works in Hindi television. She made her acting debut with Zindagi Ki Mehek in 2016, where she played Mehek Sharma and Mehek Singh Mann respectively. Jaiswal is also known for her portrayal of Noor Hassan Qureshi in Bahu Begum.

Career
Jaiswal made her television debut in 2016 with Zee TV's Zindagi Ki Mehek portraying Mehek Sharma. In 2019, she played Noor Hassan Qureshi in Colors TV's Bahu Begum.

Filmography

Television

Special appearances

Music videos

See also
 List of Hindi television actresses

References

External links

Living people
1995 births
Actresses from Mumbai
Indian television actresses
Actresses in Hindi television
21st-century Indian actresses